Jraberd or Chilabord ( or ) is a village de facto in the Martakert Province of the breakaway Republic of Artsakh, de jure in the Tartar District of Azerbaijan, in the disputed region of Nagorno-Karabakh. The village has an ethnic Armenian-majority population, and also had an Armenian majority in 1989.

History 
During the Soviet period, the village was a part of the Mardakert District of the Nagorno-Karabakh Autonomous Oblast.

The village has been administered by the Republic of Artsakh since the First Nagorno-Karabakh War. The village is on the Nagorno-Karabakh Line of Contact. There have been allegations of ceasefire violations in the village's vicinity.

Jraberd Fortress 
Hasan Jalalyan, the founder of the princely family that ruled the Principality of Khachen lived at the fortress of Jraberd, located in the mountains to the west of Maghavuz, southwest of Tonashen, close to the Yerits Mankants Monastery.

Economy and culture 
The village is part of the community of Martakert.

Demographics 
The village had 63 inhabitants in 2005, and 88 inhabitants in 2015.

References

External links 
 

Populated places in Martakert Province
Populated places in Tartar District